Mulanur is a panchayat town under in  Dharapuram taluk in Tirupur District in the Indian state of Tamil Nadu.

Geography
It has an average elevation of 238 metres (780 feet).

Mulanur is located on SH21, which runs between Dharapuram and Karur, and it is tirupur district, it was separated from erode district in 2009. Drumsticks from Mulanur region are famous. The vegetable and grocery market opens up every Wednesday in the west end of the town (Anna nagar). Mulanur is part of the Glory lily (Gloriosa superba) Market.

Near by river is Amaravathi and main drinking water source from Kaveri Joint Drinking water plan.

Demographics

Population 
 India census, Mulanur had a population of 15223. Males constitute 50% of the population and females 50%. Mulanur has an average literacy rate of 61%, higher than the national average of 59.5%: male literacy is 71%, and female literacy is 50%. In Mulanur, 8% of the population is under 6 years of age.

Economy 
Farming and related businesses, Financing and Powerlooms are the most important sources of income for people.

Transport

By Air

By Rail

By Road  
Mulanur is well connected by frequent buses with Dharapuram (20 km), Karur (50 km), Vellakoil (20 km), Erode (55 km), Madurai, Palani and Chennai. The district headquarters Tiruppur is 60 km away from Mulanur.

Education 
Mulanur is having one higher secondary School, which is the main one for the nearby villager to study and it is operated by state Government.

References 

Cities and towns in Tiruppur district